Euxesta willistoni is a species of ulidiid or picture-winged fly in the genus Euxesta of the family Ulidiidae. It was described by Daniel William Coquillett in 1900.

References

willistoni
Insects described in 1900
Taxa named by Daniel William Coquillett